Jack Henry Quaid (born April 24, 1992) is an American actor. The son of actors Meg Ryan and Dennis Quaid, he made his acting debut with a minor role in the dystopian film The Hunger Games (2012). Quaid had his breakout role as vigilante Hughie Campbell in the Amazon Prime Video superhero series The Boys (2019–present). 

Among other roles, Quaid was part of the main cast of HBO's drama series Vinyl (2016) and has had numerous voice acting roles such as Brad Boimler in Star Trek: Lower Decks (2020–present). In film, he has appeared in The Hunger Games (2012), Logan Lucky (2017), and as Richie Kirsch in the slasher film Scream (2022).

Early life
Quaid was born on April 24, 1992, in Los Angeles, California, to actors Meg Ryan and Dennis Quaid. He was President of the Bad Movie Club at Crossroads School in Santa Monica, California, and later he attended NYU's Tisch School of the Arts for three years.

Career
In 2012, Quaid made his film debut as Marvel in the film The Hunger Games. In an interview, he explained his experience while filming: "We had torrential downpours, flooding, scorching heat and then a bear would wander onto the set. But it was an amazing bonding experience. We definitely all had a great story to tell about what we did on our summer vacation." He also said that he was warned of a backlash from fans because of his character's dastardly acts: "When I got cast, I was told that people would be spitting on me in the streets." In 2013, he reprised Marvel for a flashback scene in The Hunger Games: Catching Fire in a cameo appearance.

Following his involvement with the Hunger Games franchise, Quaid took part in a series of independent films, including his own film Roadies, which was funded through donations on the crowdsourcing website Indiegogo. During this time, he was part of the sketch comedy troop Sasquatch Sketch, which was active from 2013 to 2017, produced dozens of comedy videos, and performed live in the Los Angeles area. Quaid also acted in other comedic webseries and shorts.

Quaid appeared in the main cast of the short-lived HBO television series Vinyl, which premiered in February 2016. In 2017, he appeared in Steven Soderbergh’s heist comedy Logan Lucky, and starred as Jordan Welch in the horror comedy film Tragedy Girls, which was released in theaters on October 20, 2017.

On March 6, 2018, Deadline announced that Quaid was cast as Hugh "Hughie" Campbell, the lead role of the Amazon drama series The Boys. The series premiered in July 2019. Since its debut, it has been renewed for a second, third, and fourth season. In late 2018, Quaid and his fellow The Boys co-star Erin Moriarty both appeared in the music video for Creedence Clearwater Revival's song "Have You Ever Seen the Rain?".

In July 2019, Variety announced that Quaid was cast as Ensign Brad Boimler in the new CBS All Access animated series Star Trek: Lower Decks. This follows his voice acting role on the Netflix animated series Harvey Girls Forever!.
In the same year, Quaid starred in romantic-comedy Plus One. In September 2020, he was cast in the fifth Scream film, which was released on January 14, 2022.

Quaid was cast in Christopher Nolan's upcoming historical epic Oppenheimer, scheduled for release on July 21, 2023.

Personal life
Quaid resides in Los Angeles, California. He was in a relationship with actress Lizzy McGroder from 2016 to 2021.

Filmography

Film

Television

Video games

Web series

Music video

Awards and nominations

References

External links
 

1992 births
21st-century American male actors
American male film actors
American male television actors
American male voice actors
American people of English descent
American people of French descent
American people of Irish descent
American people of Polish descent
Crossroads School alumni
Living people
Male actors from Los Angeles
Tisch School of the Arts alumni